Ngozi Okonjo-Iweala  (born 13 June 1954) is a Nigerian economist, who has been serving as the Director-General of the World Trade Organization since March 2021. Notably, she is the first woman and first African to lead the World Trade Organization as Director-General. She sits on boards of: Danone, Standard Chartered Bank, MINDS: Mandela Institute for Development Studies, Carnegie Endowment for International Peace, Georgetown Institute for Women, Peace and Security, One Campaign, GAVI: Global Alliance for Vaccines and Immunization, Rockefeller Foundation, R4D: Results for Development, ARC: African Risk Capacity and Earthshot Prize plus others.She also previously sat on the Twitter Board of Directors, and stepped down in February, 2021 in connection with her appointment as Director General of the World Trade Organization.

Okonjo-Iweala serves Brookings Institution as a non-resident distinguished fellow with the Africa Growth Initiative in their Global Economy and Development Program. She is a  Commissioner Emeritus and Co-Chair of Global Commission on the Economy and Climate. At The World Bank, she had a 25-year career as a development economist; rising to become Managing Director for Operations from 2007 to 2011. Okonjo-Iweala  was the first Nigerian woman to serve two terms as Finance Minister of Nigeria; initially, under President Olusegun Obasanjo from 2003 to 2006; and secondly, under President Goodluck Jonathan from 2011 to 2015. Subsequently, from June to August 2006, she served as Minister for Foreign Affairs of Nigeria. In 2005, Euromoney named her Global Finance Minister of the Year.

Early life and education
Okonjo-Iweala was born in Ogwashi-Ukwu, Delta State, Nigeria, where her father, Professor Chukwuka Okonjo, was the Obi (king) of the Obahai royal family of Ogwashi-Ukwu in Nigeria.

Okonjo-Iweala was educated at Queen's School, Enugu; St. Anne's School, Molete, Ibadan, Oyo State; and the International School Ibadan. She arrived in the US in 1973 to study at Harvard University and graduated  with an AB in Economics in 1976. She earned a master's degree in city planning  in 1978 and her PhD in regional economics and development in 1981 from the Massachusetts Institute of Technology with the thesis Credit policy, rural financial markets, and Nigeria's agricultural development. She received an international fellowship from the American Association of University Women (AAUW), which supported her doctoral studies.

Career

World Bank

Okonjo-Iweala had a 25-year career at the World Bank in Washington, D.C., as a development economist and rose to the No.2 position of Managing Director, Operations. As managing director, she had oversight responsibility for the World Bank’s $81 billion operational portfolio in Africa, South Asia, Europe, and Central Asia. Okonjo-Iweala spearheaded several World Bank initiatives to assist low-income countries during the 2008–2009 food crises and later during the financial crisis. In 2010, she was the chair person of the IDA replenishment, the World Bank’s successful drive to raise $49.3 billion in grants and low-interest credit for the poorest countries in the world. During her time at the World Bank, she was also a member of the Commission on Effective Development Cooperation with Africa, which was set up by Danish Prime Minister Anders Fogh Rasmussen and held meetings between April and October 2008.

In government 
Okonjo-Iweala served twice as Nigeria's Finance Minister (2003–2006 and 2011–2015) and briefly acted as Foreign Minister in 2006. She was the first woman to hold both positions. During her first term as Finance Minister in the administration of President Olusegun Obasanjo, she spearheaded negotiations with the Paris Club that led to the wiping out of US$30 billion of Nigeria's debt, including the outright cancellation of US$18 billion. In 2003, she led efforts to improve Nigeria’s macroeconomic management including the implementation of an oil-price based fiscal rule. Revenues accruing above a reference benchmark oil price were saved in a special account, the "Excess Crude Account," which helped to reduce macroeconomic volatility. Okonjo-Iweala was also instrumental in helping Nigeria obtain its first ever sovereign credit rating (of BB minus) from Fitch Ratings and Standard & Poor’s in 2006. She also introduced the practice of publishing the federal, state, and local government shares of revenue from the country’s federal account. That action went a long way in increasing transparency in governance at all levels of government, particularly the sub-national level.
Following her first term as Minister of Finance, she served two months as Minister of Foreign Affairs in 2006. She returned to the World Bank as a Managing Director in December 2007.

In 2011, Okonjo-Iweala was re-appointed as Minister of Finance in Nigeria with the expanded portfolio of the Coordinating Minister for the Economy by President Goodluck Jonathan. In her second term as Finance Minister, Dr Okonjo-Iweala was responsible for leading reform that enhanced transparency of government accounts and strengthened institutions against corruption, including the implementation of the GIFMS (Government Integrated Financial Management System), the IPPMS (Integrated Personnel and Payroll Management System), and the TSA (Treasury Single Accounts). As of February 2015, the IPPIS platform had eliminated 62,893 ghost workers from the system and saved the government about $1.25 billion in the process. 

Her legacy includes strengthening the country's public financial systems and stimulating the housing sector with the establishment of the Nigerian Mortgage Refinance Corporation (NMRC) in 2013. Under her leadership, the National Bureau of Statistics carried out a re-basing exercise of the Gross Domestic Product (GDP), the first in 24 years, which saw Nigeria emerge as the largest economy in Africa. She also empowered women and youth with the Growing Girls and Women in Nigeria Programme (GWIN), a gender-responsive budgeting system, and the highly acclaimed Youth Enterprise with Innovation Programme (YouWIN); to support entrepreneurs, that created thousands of jobs. As part of Goodluck Jonathan's administration, she received death threats and endured the kidnapping of her mother when she tried to sanitise Nigeria’s fuel subsidy payments to some marketers in 2012. 

In addition to her role in government, Okonjo-Iweala served on the Commission on Growth and Development (2006–2009), led by Nobel Prize winner Professor Michael Spence. She was a member of the International Monetary and Finance Committee of the IMF (2003-2006 and 2011-2015) and the United Nations’ Secretary-General’s High-Level Panel on the Post-2015 Development Agenda (2012–2013). She also co-chaired the Global Partnership for Effective Development Cooperation with UK Secretary Justine Greening.  In 2012, she was a candidate for President of the World Bank, running against former Colombian finance minister Jose Antonio Ocampo and Dartmouth College President Jim Yong Kim; if elected, she would have become the organization's first female president.

Later career
After leaving government, Okonjo-Iweala became a member of the International Commission on Financing Global Education Opportunity (2015–2016), chaired by Gordon Brown, and the Eminent Persons Group on Global Financial Governance, which was established by the G20 Finance Ministers and Central Bank Governors (2017–2018). From 2014, she has been co-chairing the Global Commission for the Economy and Climate, with Nicholas Stern and Paul Polman. She also served as Chair of the Board of Gavi, the Vaccine Alliance (2016-2020).  

Okonjo-Iweala is the founder of Nigeria's first indigenous opinion-research organization, NOI-Polls. She also founded the Centre for the Study of the Economies of Africa (C-SEA), a development research think-tank based in Abuja, and is a Distinguished Visiting Fellow at the Center for Global Development and the Brookings Institution.

Since 2019, Okonjo-Iweala has been part of UNESCO's International Commission on the Futures of Education, chaired by Sahle-Work Zewde. Also since 2019, she has also been serving on the High-Level Council on Leadership & Management for Development of the Aspen Management Partnership for Health (AMP Health). In 2020, the International Monetary Fund's Managing Director Kristalina Georgieva appointed her to an external advisory group to provide input on policy challenges. Also in 2020, she was appointed by the African Union (AU) as special envoy to solicit international support to help the continent deal with the economic impact of the COVID-19 pandemic, as well as World Health Organization COVID-19 Special Envoy.

In June 2020, Nigerian President Muhammadu Buhari nominated Okonjo-Iweala as the country’s candidate to be director-general of the World Trade Organization (WTO). She later advanced to the election's final round and eventually competed with Yoo Myung-hee. Ahead of the vote, she received the backing of the European Union for her candidacy. In October 2020, the United States government indicated that it would not back Okonjo-Iweala's candidacy. The WTO in its formal report said that Okonjo-Iweala "clearly carried the largest support by Members in the final round; and, enjoyed broad support from Members from all levels of development and from all geographic regions and has done so throughout the process"  On 5 February 2021, Yoo Myung-hee announced her withdrawal from the race in "close consultation with the United States." According to a statement issued from the United States Trade Representative, “The United States takes note of today’s decision by the Republic of Korea’s Trade Minister Yoo Myung-hee to withdraw her candidacy for Director General of the WTO. The Biden-Harris Administration is pleased to express its strong support for the candidacy of Dr. Ngozi Okonjo-Iweala as the next Director General of the WTO." Okonjo-Iweala was unanimously appointed as the next Director-General on 15 February.  She began her career as Director General of the WTO on 1 March 2021.

In early 2021, Okonjo-Iweala was appointed as co-chair, alongside Tharman Shanmugaratnam and Lawrence Summers, of the G20 High Level Independent Panel (HLIP) on financing the global commons for pandemic preparedness and response and was one of the founders of the COVAX Facility, designed to get affordable vaccines to Low and Middle-Income Countries. In July 2021, she joined the Multilateral Leaders Task Force on COVID-19 Vaccines, Therapeutics, and Diagnostics for Developing Countries, co-chaired by Tedros Adhanom and David Malpass. In January 2022, Okonjo-Iweala joined The Group of thirty (G30), an independent body of distinguished policymakers from around the world.

Personal life 

She is married to Ikemba Iweala, a neurosurgeon from Umuahia, Abia State, Nigeria. They have four children, including author Uzodinma Iweala.

During her campaign to become the next Director-General of the WTO, it was revealed that Okonjo-Iweala became a US citizen in 2019 after spending several decades working and studying there. Given the ongoing trade tensions between China and the US, analysts commented that the disclosure would be a contributing factor in shaping China’s attitude towards her.

Other activities

Government agencies
 Japan International Cooperation Agency (JICA), Member of the International Advisory Board (since 2017)

International organizations
 Asian Infrastructure Investment Bank (AIIB), Member of the International Advisory Panel (since 2016)
 OECD/UNDP Tax Inspectors Without Borders (TIWB), Member of the Board
 GAVI, Chair of the Board (2016–2020)
 African Development Bank (AfDB), Ex-Officio Member of the Board of Governors (2003–2006, 2011–2015)
 International Monetary Fund (IMF), Member of the International Monetary and Finance Committee (2003–2006, 2011–2015)
 Joint World Bank-IMF Development Committee, Chair (2004)

Corporate boards
 Danone, Member of the Mission Committee (since 2020)
 Twitter, Member of the Board of Directors (since 2018)
 Standard Chartered, Independent Non-executive Member of the Board of Directors (since 2017)
 Lazard, Senior Advisor (since 2015)

Non-profit organizations
 Africa Europe Foundation (AEF), Member of the High-Level Group of Personalities on Africa-Europe Relations (since 2020)
 Carnegie Endowment for International Peace, Member of the Board of Trustees (since 2019)
 Bloomberg New Economy Forum, Member of the Advisory Board (since 2018)
 Results for Development (R4D), Member of the Board of Directors (since 2014)
 Women's World Banking, Member of the Africa Advisory Council (since 2014)
 The B Team, Member (since 2013)
 Friends of the Global Fund Africa, Member of the Board (since 2007)
 Global Financial Integrity (GFI), Member of the Advisory Board (since 2007)
 African Risk Capacity, Chair of the Board
 African University of Science and Technology, Chair of the Board
 Georgetown Institute for Women, Peace and Security, Member of the Advisory Board
 Global Business Coalition for Education, Member of the Advisory Board
 International Growth Centre (IGC), Senior Advisor
 Mandela Institute for Development Studies (MINDS), Member of the Advisory Board
 Mercy Corps, Member of the Global Leadership Council
 Rockefeller Foundation, Member of the Board of Trustees (2008–2018)
 Nelson Mandela Institution, Chair of the Board
 One Campaign, Member of the Board
 Oxford Martin School, Member of the Advisory Council
 Vital Voices, Member of the Global Advisory Council
 World Economic Forum Young Global Leaders Foundation, former Member of the Board

Recognition

Awards
Okonjo-Iweala has received numerous recognition and awards. She has been listed as one of the 50 Greatest World Leaders (Fortune, 2015), the Top 100 Most Influential People in the World (TIME, 2014 and 2021), the Top 100 Global Thinkers (Foreign Policy, 2011 and 2012), the Top 100 Most Powerful Women in the World (Forbes, 2011, 2012, 2013, 2014 and 2022), the 25 Most Influential Women in the World (Financial Times, 2021), the Top 3 Most Powerful Women in Africa (Forbes, 2012), the Top 10 Most Influential Women in Africa (Forbes, 2011), the Top 100 Women in the World (The Guardian, 2011), the Top 150 Women in the World (Newsweek, 2011), the Top 100 most inspiring people in the World Delivering for Girls and Women (Women Deliver, 2011). She was listed among 73 "brilliant" business influencers in the world by Condé Nast International.

In 2019, Okonjo-Iweala was elected to the American Academy of Arts and Sciences. She was also conferred High National Honours from the Republic of Côte d'Ivoire and the Republic of Liberia. She was also the recipient of Nigeria's second highest national honor Grand Commander of the Order of the Niger (GCON, 2022) and Nigeria's third highest National Honors Commander of the Federal Republic (CFR). She also received the Grand Cross of the Order of Rio Branco from the Federative Republic of Brazil in 2023. Other honors include:

 2004 – TIME’s European Heroes Award
2004 – Finance Minister of the Year, Africa Investor Magazine
2005 – Finance Minister of the Year for Africa and the Middle East, Emerging Markets Magazine
2005 – Global Finance Minister of the Year, Euromoney
2005 – Finance Minister of the Year for Africa and the Middle East, The Banker
2010 – Bishop John T. Walker Distinguished Humanitarian Service Award
2010 – Global Leadership Award, Columbia University School of International and Public Affairs
2011 – Global Leadership Award, Chicago Council on Global Affairs
2011 – President of the Italian Republic Gold Medal, Pia Manzu Centre
2014 – David Rockefeller Bridging Leadership Award
2016 – Global Fairness Award, Global Fairness Initiative
2016 – Power with Purpose Award, Devex Development Communications Network
2017 – Madeleine K. Albright Global Development Award, Aspen Institute
2017 – Women’s Economic Empowerment Award, WEConnect International
2017 – Vanguard Award, Howard University
2017 - BBC's 100 women
2020 – African of the Year, Forbes Africa
2022 – 50 Over 50: EMEA Award, Forbes 
 2022 – Golden Plate Award, American Academy of Achievement
 2022 – Humanitarian Award for a Lifetime of Public Service and Advocacy of Sustainable International Development, United Nations Association of New York

Honorary degrees
Okonjo-Iweala has received honorary Doctorate Degrees from 19 universities worldwide, including some from the most prestigious colleges:
 Brown University (2006),
Colby College (2007)
Trinity College, Dublin (2007)
Amherst College (2009)
University of Pennsylvania (2013)
Yale University (2015)
 Northern Caribbean University, Jamaica
 LUISS Guido Carli, Italy (2021) 
 American University (2022) 
 Nyenrode Business University (2022) 
 London School of Economics and Political Science (2023) 

She has also received degrees from a host of Nigerian universities including Abia State University, Delta State University, Abraka, Oduduwa University, Babcock University, and the Universities of Port Harcourt, Calabar, and Ife (Obafemi Awolowo university). In 2019, Okonjo Iweala was awarded an honorary degree from Tel Aviv University. On the 7th of February 2022 Okonjo-Iweala received her 20th honorary Doctorate Degrees from the London School of Economics.

Works

Books

Articles

Talks

Gallery

See also
 Finance Minister of Nigeria

References

External links

 Full biograpny and CV (WTO site)
 
 Time Europe's Heroes of 2004
 "2011 budget not good for development – Okonjo-Iweala"
 The Center for Global Development and The Washington Post Present: A World Bank President Candidate Event: Ngozi Okonjo-Iweala
 

|-

|-

|-

1954 births
20th-century Nigerian people
21st-century American people
21st-century Nigerian people
American people of Nigerian descent
BBC 100 Women
Brookings Institution people
Center for Global Development
Delta State politicians
Directors-General of the World Trade Organization
Fellows of the American Academy of Arts and Sciences
Female finance ministers
Female foreign ministers
Finance ministers of Nigeria
Foreign ministers of Nigeria
Harvard University alumni
International School, Ibadan alumni
Living people
MIT School of Architecture and Planning alumni
Nigerian corporate directors
Nigerian economists
Nigerian expatriates in the United States
Nigerian women diplomats
Nigerian women economists
People from Delta State
Peoples Democratic Party (Nigeria) politicians
St Anne's School, Ibadan alumni
Women corporate directors
Women government ministers of Nigeria
Women of African descent